HD 10647 (q1 Eridani) is a 6th-magnitude yellow-white dwarf star, 57 light-years away in the constellation of Eridanus. The star is visible to the unaided eye under very dark skies. It is slightly hotter and more luminous than the Sun, and at 1.75 billion years old, it is also younger. An extrasolar planet was discovered orbiting this star in 2003.

Planetary system
In 2003, Michel Mayor's team announced the discovery of a new planet, HD 10647 b, in Paris at the XIX IAP Colloquium Extrasolar Planets: Today & Tomorrow* . The Anglo-Australian Planet Search team initially did not detect the planet in 2004, though a solution was made by 2006. The CORALIE data was finally published in 2013.

The IRAS infrared space telescope detected an excess of infrared radiation from the star, indicating a possible circumstellar disk. Out of the 300 nearest Sun-like stars, the disk has the highest fractional luminosity out of all of them. It is unusually bright, but not unusually massive; the lower bound of the mass is 8 times that of the Earth.

The inclination of the disk is relatively high, and the disk is asymmetrical, being more extended in the northeast direction than the southwest. It extends from 34 astronomical units (AU) at the inner edge to 134 AU at the outer edge. The inner edge is sharp, suggesting the existence of a planet that carved out the edge. HD 10647 b, with a semimajor axis of about 2 AU, is too far to be responsible. However, other potential planets may be responsible for this feature.

There is some evidence for an additional, warm asteroid belt-like component further in, at 3 to 10 AU away from the star.

References

External links
 
 
Sky Map: HD 10647

Eridani, Q1
Eridanus (constellation)
010647
007978
0506
F-type main-sequence stars
Eridani, 5
Durchmusterung objects
3109
Planetary systems with one confirmed planet